Dominic Thiem was the defending champion, but chose to compete in Kitzbühel instead.

Feliciano López won the title, defeating Robin Haase in the final, 6–4, 7–5.

Seeds
The top four seeds receive a bye into the second round.

Draw

Finals

Top half

Bottom half

Qualifying

Seeds
The top seed received a bye into the qualifying competition.

Qualifiers

Lucky loser
  Agustín Velotti

Qualifying draw

First qualifier

Second qualifier

Third qualifier

Fourth qualifier

References
 Main Draw
 Qualifying Draw

Swiss Open Gstaad - Singles
2016 Singles